Nitrosylation is the general term for covalent incorporation of a nitric oxide "nitrosyl" moiety into another (usually organic) molecule. There are multiple chemical mechanisms by which this can be achieved; including biological enzymes and industrial processes. The biological functions of nitrosylation are particularly important as S-nitrosylation, the conjugation of NO to cysteine thiols in proteins, is an important part of cell signalling.
Coordination of NO to transition metals to give metal nitrosyl complexes, is also referred to as nitrosylation.

See also
 Nitrosation

References

Chemical reactions
Nitrogen cycle